"Eight" (Korean: 에잇; eit) (stylized in all lowercase) is a song recorded by South Korean singer-songwriter IU featuring Suga, a rapper of South Korean boy band BTS. It was released as a digital single on May 6, 2020 by EDAM Entertainment. It is IU's first single following the release of her fifth EP Love Poem (2019). The song was written by IU, Suga, and El Capitxn and produced by Suga. Musically, "Eight" has been described as a "nostalgic" pop rock song with lyrics that find IU confessing as a twenty-eight year old, using a virtual figure and various analogies.

The song received generally positive reviews from music critics, who not only praised its lyrics and production, but also compared the song to the works of  musicians such as Avicii, Zedd and Alessia Cara. Commercially, the single debuted at number one on the South Korean Gaon Digital Chart. It also entered the Billboard World Digital Song Sales chart at number one. The accompanying music video for "Eight" was directed by Kim Woogie (GDW) and features IU revisiting various phases of her youth through her memories.

Background and release
On April 27, 2020, EDAM Entertainment announced that IU would release a new digital single on May 6, 2020, which would be a collaboration with Suga from BTS. The agency also reported that IU was involved in several aspects of the song, such as its composition and concept. It is IU's first single to be released after six months, following her fifth EP Love Poem in 2019. On April 28, the first teaser photo was revealed via the singer's official Twitter along with the song's name, "Eight". The teaser contains a close-up image with one hand and a white dress adorned with colorful accessories. A second teaser photo was released on IU's official SNS accounts on April 30. The photo shows the singer in a faded Medieval dress, staring outside the window anxiously with blank eyes. The style of the second teaser image is in contrast to the lighting, costumes and nail tips depicted in the first teaser. On May 2, a 17-second moving teaser of the song was released through IU's SNS account. It shows a round reel tape playing constantly and a snippet of the song's lyrics "So are you happy now" was heard towards the end of the teaser. On May 5, a 40-second music video teaser of the song was released through the YouTube channel, 1theK Originals. Set in a "futuristic" backdrop, it shows IU dressed in white, entering a laboratory and then laying down on an examination table. The song was released for streaming and digital download on May 6.

Composition and production

"Eight" was written and composed by IU and its producer Suga who also featured on the track. In an interview, IU said that she decided to work with Suga to deliver music that feels different from the music style that was previously presented to fans. Talking about the production process behind the song in a V Live broadcast, Suga stated that it was very smooth. He recalled, "There wasn’t a lot of back-and-forth. Shortly after I sent the (song’s) beats to her, she sent it back with the melody."

"Eight" follows IU's previous singles "Twenty-three" (2015) and "Palette" (2017) which together comprise her "coming-of-age" series. The song's title derives from the last digit of the Korean age "twenty-eight" of both singers. Musically, "Eight" has been described as pop rock song that fuses acoustic EDM and trendy rock sounds with "delicate and emotional" vocals and "soothing rapping". The song is composed in the key of C♯ major with a tempo of 120 beats per minute. It runs for two minutes and forty-seven seconds. It derives from piano and guitar instrumentation and incorporates Suga's characteristic "airy" synths in its production for which the song invokes "feel-good" and "nostalgic" vibes. According to IU, the lyrics are a confession of a twenty-eight year old "using a virtual figure and various metaphors". It has a theme of "self-reflection." Teen Vogues Sara Delgado described "Eight" as "a narration between two characters in soliloquy form" that "dwells on memories and past encounters" and felt that the various analogies in the song are used "to transmit a sense of longing, all through the lens of youth and loss."

Critical reception
Reviewing for IZM, Hwang Sun-up gave the song a positive review, praising the lyrics and production and likened its musical direction to Avicii's "Wake Me Up" and Zedd and Alessia Cara's "Stay".

Commercial performance
"Eight" debuted at number one on the week 19 issue of South Korea's Gaon Digital Chart for the period dated May 3–9, 2020. The song also took first place on the component Download chart for the same period, and entered the Streaming chart at number two, peaking at number one the following week on the chart issue for the period dated May 10–16. It topped the monthly digital charts for both May and June. In the United States, with only two days of activity counted—the song was released on a Wednesday, just before the end of the weekly tracking period—"Eight" debuted atop the Billboard World Digital Song Sales chart issue dated May 16, becoming both IU and Suga's (as a solo artist) first number one on the ranking. The song sold 6,965 copies and entered the US Digital Songs chart at number 13, making it one of the highest-charting Korean-language songs in the chart's history. In the United Kingdom, the song entered the OCC's Singles Downloads component chart at number 42.

Six months after its release, "Eight" was certified Platinum by the Korea Music Content Association (KMCA) on November 12, 2020, for surpassing 100 million domestic streams. It ended 2020 as the sixth most-downloaded and streamed song in South Korea, and was the sixth best-performing digital single overall.

Music video
The song's accompanying music video premiered simultaneously with the release of the single. Directed by Kim Woogie (GDW), its synopsis follows IU  as the protagonist, "growing out of her youth". The video opens with IU walking into a "futuristic" sci-fi room. She activates a "mysterious machine" and lies on a "stretcher".  She then goes back to various phases of her life through her memories. The video alternates between "high-quality" 3D and 2D animated scenes and "live-action" clips of her travelling to different worlds. There are scenes where she strolls through a house, and in others she treasures a "gecko" in different forms of herself. The video ends with her waking up from her trance.

Accolades

Credits and personnel
Credits adapted from Melon.

IU – lead vocals, songwriting, arrangement
Suga – featured vocals, production, songwriting, arrangement, piano, synthesizer
 El Capitxn – songwriting, arrangement, piano, synthesizer
 Jukjae – guitar
Vendors (Zenur) – guitar
 Choi In-sung  – bass
 Song Myung-gab – recording
Kang Sun-young  – engineering
Gu Jong-pil – mixing
Kwon Nam-woo – mastering

Charts

Weekly charts

Monthly charts

Year-end charts

Certifications

! colspan="3" | Streaming
|-

Release history

See also
 List of Gaon Digital Chart number ones of 2020
 List of K-pop Hot 100 number ones
 List of number-one songs of 2020 (Malaysia)
 List of number-one songs of 2020 (Singapore)

References 

2020 songs
2020 singles
Korean-language songs
IU (singer) songs
Gaon Digital Chart number-one singles
Billboard Korea K-Pop number-one singles
Number-one singles in Malaysia
Number-one singles in Singapore
Songs written by IU (singer)
Songs written by Suga (rapper)
Song recordings produced by Suga (rapper)